Vegter is a surname. Notable people with the surname include:

 Anne Vegter (born 1958), Dutch poet, playwright, and writer
 Henny Vegter (born 1958), Dutch sailor
 Jaap Vegter (1932–2003), Dutch cartoonist
 , Dutch architect

Dutch-language surnames